Dev-Em is a fictional character who appears in DC Comics. He first appeared in Adventure Comics #287 (June 1961), created by Jerry Siegel and George Papp. Various versions of the Dev-Em character has appeared over the years in Legion of Super-Heroes related comic books.

The original Dev-Em was a Kryptonian juvenile delinquent that attacked Superboy; after being thwarted by Superboy, Dev-Em traveled to the 30th century where he became an occasional ally of the Legion. Once DC Comics re-wrote their history with Crisis on Infinite Earths Dev-Em was changed into a Daxamite instead of a Kryptonian. Post-Infinite Crisis, he was once again made a Kryptonian; a criminal sentenced to the Phantom Zone.

Fictional character biography

Pre-Crisis
In the pre-Crisis on Infinite Earths continuity, Dev-Em is a Kryptonian juvenile delinquent who took Jor-El's warnings of Krypton's impending doom seriously enough to place himself in suspended animation in an orbiting space capsule. When the planet Krypton exploded, Dev-Em's ship was blasted into space, where it eventually landed on Earth. Dev-Em imprisons Superboy in the Phantom Zone and assumes his identity in an effort to destroy the Boy of Steel's reputation. Eventually he frees Superboy and departs from the twentieth century, traveling through time to finally settle on the more advanced Earth of the 30th century. Since the people of Smallville will not believe Superboy's story of the impostor, he has to use a cover story that he was acting under the influence of Red Kryptonite to restore his reputation.

Dev-Em returns in Adventure Comics #320 (May 1964), where it is revealed that the so-called "Knave of Krypton" has reformed and joined the Interstellar Counter-Intelligence Corps of the 30th century. He is reluctantly offered membership in the Legion of Super-Heroes but turns it down. Despite his occasionally abrasive nature, Dev-Em aids the Legion on several occasions, most notably in the "Great Darkness Saga" against Darkseid.

Post-Crisis, Pre-Zero Hour
In the limited series Who's Who in the Legion of Super-Heroes #1 (April 1988), his post-Crisis background was changed. Since Superman is now the only survivor of Krypton because of the Superman reboot, his entry in this encyclopedia-like series states that he is "David Emery", a resident of Titan, home world of Saturn Girl, who uses his mental powers to give himself Kryptonian-style super powers. This origin is never used in any actual comic story.

Dev-Em appears in the "Time and Time Again" storyline in which the Man of Steel bounces between the 30th century (home of the Legion) and the 20th century. Superman encounters Dev-Em, now portrayed as an insane Daxamite, as a full grown adult whose powers rivaled Superman's. He tried to destroy the Earth's moon but was challenged by the Legion. Dev-Em makes short work of Superman, Laurel Gand and the rest of the Legion. Dev-Em is seemingly stopped by Shrinking Violet as she shrinks to a small size and enters Dev-Em's ear, scratching his insides. However, he soon initiates the Dominators' covert Triple Strike program, destroying the moon and causing massive damage to cities across the Earth.

Post-Infinite Crisis
In the aftermath of the Infinite Crisis in which Kon-El died, a man going by the name Devem is seen as part of a cult of Kryptonian worshippers called the "Cult of Conner" in 52 #4 (May 31, 2006). He is revealed to actually be a "psych-ward refugee named Derek Mathers who has a history of fraud".

In Action Comics Geoff Johns, Richard Donner and Adam Kubert present a new version of Dev-Em. This Dev-Em is a renegade Kryptonian being held as a prisoner for murder and perversion. As with most Kryptonian prisoners, he is sentenced to the Phantom Zone. He attacks Superman there but is eventually taken down by Mon-El.

Powers and abilities

In both his Daxamite and Kryptonian iterations, Dev-Em is possessed of the same superhuman abilities of both races while beneath the empowering light of a yellow sun such as that of Earth's solar system. His basic abilities are superhuman strength, superhuman speed and superhuman stamina sufficient to bend steel in his bare hands, overpower a locomotive, leap over a tall building in a single bound and outrun a speeding bullet; heightened senses of hearing and sight including X-ray vision as well as telescopic and microscopic vision; virtual invulnerability; accelerated healing; longevity; powerful freezing breath; heat vision; and flight.

In his Post-Infinite Crisis Kryptonian iteration, Dev-Em is never allowed to experience the full measure of his abilities as he is never permitted full exposure and absorption of the yellow solar radiation of Earth's sun before he is eventually defeated and banished back to the Phantom Zone. Like other Phantom Zone escapees, Dev-Em's abilities are insufficient compared to those of Superman due to his relatively short time in the Sun compared to Superman. His only advantage being his superior hand-to-hand combat prowess as a member of Krypton's military as well as his ruthless mindset and courage in battle.

In his Daxamite iteration, he shares the race's genetic vulnerability to terminal lead poisoning. In his Kryptonian iterations, he is vulnerable to kryptonite. In both iterations, he is vulnerable to red sun radiation which cancels out the yellow solar radiation flourishing in his cells and subsequently neutralizes his abilities. His virtual invulnerability offers no protection against mind control or magic nor can it withstand the force of several atomic bombs without causing him sufficient injury; he is also vulnerable to opponents of superior strength such as Doomsday nor can he outrun Speedsters such as the Flash.

Other versions
In the prequel comic to Man of Steel (which is set thousands of years in the past), Dev-Em I is portrayed as a Kryptonian in training who begins killing his competitors but is caught and put on trial for doing so. Despite this, he was able to escape prosecution on Krypton and managed to make his way on a scout ship during a Kryptonian expedition to Earth. Dev-Em killed the entire crew on the ship, with the exception of Kara Zor-El. He is killed in a struggle with Kara, as the ship crashes on Earth. Kara is seen leaving the wreckage, which would later be known as the "Fortress of Solitude".

In other media

Television
Dev-Em appears in the TV series Krypton, portrayed by Aaron Pierre. This version is a new Kryptonian soldier of the Sagitari (Kandor's military) intended to wed his superior, Lyta-Zod. In the first season, he appears in the service of Voice of Rao (controlled by Brainiac). He later joins the resistance, but is brainwashed by Voice of Rao/Brainiac, only to later be freed from him and assisting in the battle for Kandor. In the second season, following his desertation from Sagitari, he returns with Jayna-Zod in the fight against General Zod's regime. Dev and Jayna later witness the death of Lyta-Zod by Jax-Ur, but is later revealed to be a clone made by General Zod and they find her in the Military Guild who was captive and induced with Black Mercy. After Seg and Lyta come in Kandor to confront Zod, Dev participates in the battle on Outlands outpost against Sagitari. After taking down Zod and retreat of Sagitari, Dev and Jayna later discover a frozen meteorite containing Doomsday who survived the destruction of the moon Wegthor.

Film

Dev-Em II appears in the film Man of Steel, portrayed by Revard Dufresne. He appears as one of General Zod's followers and belongs to the same House of Em. After he and the followers of Zod rebelled against the Kryptonian high council, they are defeated and sentenced to spend three hundred years in the Phantom Zone. Days after the conviction, the planet Krypton is destroyed which causes the sentenced to get out of their prison. Dev-Em accompanies the general to Earth where they try to conquer it to turn it into a new Krypton, however their plan is thwarted by the teamwork of Superman and the US military, being sent to the Phantom Zone.

References

External links
Dev-Em at the Unofficial Who's Who of the DC Universe

Fictional cryonically preserved characters
Comics characters introduced in 1961
Characters created by Jerry Siegel
DC Comics male supervillains
Kryptonians
Characters created by George Papp
DC Comics characters who can move at superhuman speeds
DC Comics characters with accelerated healing
DC Comics characters with superhuman senses
DC Comics characters with superhuman strength
Superman characters
Fictional criminals
Fictional soldiers
Fictional cult leaders